Aşıkşenlik (formerly Sukara and Yakınsu) is a quarter of the town Çıldır, Çıldır District, Ardahan Province, Turkey. Its population is 277 (2021). Before the 2013 reorganisation, it was a town (belde). The present name of the town refers to an Aşık Şenlik, a folk poet (1850-1913).

Geography
It is situated in a high altitude wetland.

History
Aşıkşenlik is an old settlement. It was captured by Seljukid sultan Alp Arslan in 1064. After Harzemshah, Kipchaks and Mongols dominations it was annexed by the Ottoman sultan Süleyman I in 1546. According to Evliya Çelebi who lived in the 17th century, Aşıkşenlik (then known as Sukara) was one of the wealthiest towns of the Ottoman Empire in the east. In 1877 Russians captured Aşıkşenlik during the Russo-Turkish War (1877-1878).  But in 1921 it was returned to Turkey. It was officially declared township in 1966.

Economy
Animal husbandry is the main economic sector. Ovine and cattle as well as goose are raised.  Although the border check point is nearby, the gate is closed and at the moment there is no revenue from border trade.

References

Populated places in Ardahan Province
Çıldır District